Nitin Sawhney's eighth studio album London Undersound was released on , by Cooking Vinyl.

It includes collaborations with Paul McCartney, Natty, Imogen Heap, Reena Bhardwaj, Ojos de Brujo, Anoushka Shankar, Tina Grace, Faheem Mazhar, Aruba Red, and Roxanne Tataei.

Reception
Reviewed by the BBC's Chris Jones as "an album with its heart firmly in the right place".

Track listing

References

 News about album release
 Deutschlandradio Kultur / CD der Woche – 13 October 2008
 London Undersound at Nitin Sawhney's official website.

External links
Official Website

2008 albums
Nitin Sawhney albums
Cooking Vinyl albums